SS R. Walton Moore was a Liberty ship built in the United States during World War II. She was named after R. Walton Moore, a member of the Virginia Senate and United States Representative from Virginia.

Construction
R. Walton Moore was laid down on 1 July 1944, under a Maritime Commission (MARCOM) contract, MC hull 2370, by J.A. Jones Construction, Brunswick, Georgia; she was sponsored by Mrs. Charles P. Howze, and launched on 14 August 1944.

History
She was allocated to Parry Navigation Co., on 26 August 1944. On 2 November 1948, she was laid up in the National Defense Reserve Fleet in the Suisun Bay Group. On 5 June 1955, she was withdrawn from the fleet to be loaded with grain under the "Grain Program 1955", she relocated to the Olympia Group, loaded with grain on 15 June 1955. She was  withdrawn from the fleet on 12 January 1958, to have the grain unloaded and returned empty on 19 January 1958. On 6 February 1961, she was sold for scrapping to Zidell Exploration, Inc., for $56,333.41. She was removed from the fleet on 23 May 1961.

References

Bibliography

 
 
 
 
 

 

Liberty ships
Ships built in Brunswick, Georgia
1944 ships
Suisun Bay Reserve Fleet
Olympia Reserve Fleet
Olympia Reserve Fleet Grain Program